NISL may refer to:
National Indoor Soccer League (2021-)
National Indoor Soccer League, former name of the Major Indoor Soccer League (2008–2014)
Northern Ireland Sign Language